Uroš Kodelja (born 15 August 1974 in Nova Gorica) is a Slovenian slalom canoeist who competed at the international level from 1992 to 2007.

Kodelja won a bronze medal in the K1 team event at the 1998 European Championships in Roudnice nad Labem. He also finished tenth in the K1 event at the 2004 Summer Olympics in Athens.

References

1974 births
Canoeists at the 2004 Summer Olympics
Living people
Olympic canoeists of Slovenia
Slovenian male canoeists
People from Nova Gorica